The Trekboers were nomadic pastoralists descended from European settlers on the frontiers of the Dutch Cape Colony in Southern Africa. The Trekboers began migrating into the interior from the areas surrounding what is now Cape Town, such as Paarl (settled from 1688), Stellenbosch (founded in 1679), and Franschhoek (settled from 1688), during the late 17th century and throughout the 18th century. The Trekboer includes mixed-race families of partial Khoikoi descent that had also become established within the economic class of burghers.

Origins
The Trekboers were seminomadic pastoralists, subsistence farmers who began trekking both northwards and eastwards into the interior to find better pastures/farmlands for their livestock to graze, as well as to escape the autocratic rule of the Dutch East India Company (or VOC), which administered the Cape. They believed the VOC was tainted with corruption and not concerned with the interests of the free burghers, the social class of most of the Trekboers.

Trekboers also traded with indigenous people.  This meant their herds were of hardy local stock.  They formed a vital link between the pool of animals in the interior and the providers of shipping provisions at the Cape. Trekboere were nomadic, living in their wagons and rarely remaining in one location for an extended period of time. A number of Trekboers settled in the eastern Cape, where their descendants became known as Grensboere (Border Farmers).

Expansion

Despite the VOC's attempts to prevent settler expansion beyond the western Cape, the frontier of the Colony remained open: the authorities in Cape Town lacked the means to police the Colony's borders. 
By the 1740s the Trekboers had entered the Little Karoo.  By the 1760s they reached the deep interior of the Great Karoo.

Independent republics
Due to the collapse of the VOC (which went bankrupt in 1800) and inspired by the French Revolution (1789) and the American Revolution, groups of Boers rebelled against VOC rule. They set up independent republics in the town of Graaff-Reinet (1795), and four months later, in Swellendam (17 June 1795).  A few months later, the newly established Batavian Republic nationalised the VOC (1 March 1796); the Netherlands came under the sway of the new post-revolution French government.

The British, who captured Cape Town in September 1795 in the course of the French Revolutionary Wars and took over the administration of Cape Colony, increased the level of government oversight the Trekboers were subject to. Tensions between the Trekboers and the British colonial administration would culminate in the Slachter's Nek Rebellion of 1815, which was rapidly suppressed and the leaders of the rebellion executed. Eventually, due to a combination of dissatisfaction with the British administration, constant frontier wars with the Xhosa to the east, and growing shortages of land, the Trekboers eventually went on the Great Trek.

Legacy

Numerous Trekboers settled down to become border farmers for a few generations and later voortrekkers. But many of the group continued well into the 20th century as an economic class of nomadic pastoralists.

Many Trekboers crossed the Orange River decades before the Voortrekkers did.  Voortrekkers often encountered Trekboers in Transorangia during their Great Trek of the 1830s and 1840s.  In 1815, a Trekboer/trader named Coenraad (Du) Buys (a surname of French Huguenot origin) was accused of cattle theft and fled from the British. He settled in the (western) Transvaal. He allegedly contracted polygamous marriages with hundreds of indigenous women, with his descendants' populating the town of Buysplaas in the Gourits River valley. He continued having numerous wives after leaving the colony.  Descendants of his second series of marriages still live in the small town of Buysdorp, near the mission station of Mara, 20 km to the west of Louis Trichardt in the modern Limpopo province. Buys eventually disappeared while traveling along the Limpopo River.

By the late 19th century, both the Trekboers and the Voortrekkers were collectively called Boers.

During the 20th century, both Boers and the Cape Dutch – those who did not trek eastward and remained in the Western Cape – became known as Afrikaners. This term was applied to all Afrikaans-speakers of Western and Central European (Dutch, German, French Huguenot) ancestry.  The term later sometimes included Afrikaans speakers of mixed-race origins, classified as non-White (chiefly those who became known as Cape Coloureds in the Cape Province) and related mixed-race groups such as the Baster people.) Since the early 21st century, some descendants of the Trekboers have preferred to be called the boerevolk.

Language

The Trekboers spoke a variety of Dutch which they called die taal (lit. 'the language'), which evolved into the modern-day dialect Eastern Border Afrikaans, also known as East Cape Afrikaans. The Afrikaans language as a whole generally originated from 17th- and 18th-century Dutch dialects. Over time it incorporated numerous words and expressions from French, German, Portuguese, Malay, Khoi, and later also English. Still, roughly 90% of the vocabulary is of Dutch origin and it is closer linguistically to Standard Dutch than many Dutch dialects. If Afrikaans had not been defined a separate language during the 20th century, its various dialects would have been considered dialects of Dutch.

See also
 Afrikaner Calvinism
 Afrikaner nationalism
 Boer
 Boer republics
 History of Cape Colony Pre-1806

References

Pastoralists
Great Trek
Afrikaans words and phrases